Sullivan & Son is an American sitcom created by Steve Byrne and Rob Long that was broadcast on TBS. It starred Byrne as Steve Sullivan, who surprises his parents when he leaves his job as a corporate lawyer to take over a bar owned by his father in Pittsburgh. The series was executive-produced by Vince Vaughn, Peter Billingsley, and Long, who also served as showrunner. It premiered on July 19, 2012.
On November 20, 2014, TBS cancelled Sullivan & Son after three seasons.

Overview

The series centers on Steve Sullivan (Byrne), a corporate attorney from New York City who visits his Irish American father Jack (Dan Lauria) and Korean mother Ok Cha (Jodi Long) just as they are preparing to sell their bar in a Pittsburgh working-class neighborhood and retire. To their surprise, he decides to stay and run the bar. The bar is a popular venue among the locals, and is the unofficial "town hall" of the neighborhood.

Cast and characters
 Steve Byrne, as Steve Sullivan, is a half-Irish and half-Korean lawyer who leaves his job to take over his parents' bar in Pittsburgh.
 Dan Lauria, as Jack Sullivan, is Steve's father.
 Jodi Long, as Ok Cha Sullivan, is Steve's mother.
 Owen Benjamin, as Owen Walsh, is a dopey and unemployed childhood friend of Steve's.
 Brian Doyle-Murray, as Hank Murphy, is a bar regular prone to making offensive remarks.
 Christine Ebersole, as Carol Walsh, is a bar regular and Owen's mother.
 Vivian Bang, as Susan Sullivan, is Steve's younger sister.
 Valerie Azlynn, as Melanie Sutton, is an emergency medical technician and love interest of Steve's.
 Roy Wood, Jr., as Roy Williams, Jr., is a bar regular and childhood friend of Steve and Owen's.
 Ahmed Ahmed, as Ahmed Nassar, is a tow truck driver, bar regular, and childhood friend of Steve and Owen's.

Recurring
 Brian Scolaro as Doug, a bar regular (season one) 
 Jesus Trejo as Javier, a bar regular
 Joshua David Gray as Father Perry, a bar regular
 Billy Gardell as Lyle Winkler, Steve's rival.
 John Michael Higgins as Gary Barton
 Ken Jeong as Jason, Susan's overachieving MD husband
 Charles Shaughnessy as Darryl
 Kunal Nayyar as Sanjay/Neal, a man of Indian descent who pretends to be a native of India.
 Brad Keselowski as himself
 Ellen Woglom as Nicolette

Special guest stars
 Perry Caravello as Javahoe Homosexual
 Chris D'Elia as Ryan Capps
 Will Sasso as Robert Sherman
 Kerri Kenney-Silver as Jo Sullivan, Jack's con-artist sister
 Brian George as Amun Nassar, Ahmed's father.
 George Wallace as Leroy Williams, Roy's father
 Ted McGinley as Eugene Casternakie
 Ryan Miller as himself
 Pat Sajak as himself 
 Frank Caliendo as Ralph
 Mo Collins as Lilly
 Catherine Reitman as April
 Loretta Devine as Rose, Roy's mother
 Bryan Callen as Paul
 Margaret Cho as Jenny, Ok Cha's niece

Production
Sullivan & Son was ordered to pilot by cable channel TBS on September 30, 2011. It was among three half-hour pilots being considered by the channel, the others being Men at Work and BFF. TBS had been developing comedies that could be paired with reruns of The Big Bang Theory. After greenlighting Men at Work to series in January 2012, TBS was to choose between Sullivan & Son and BFF to fill its new hour-long comedy slot. On February 10, 2012, TBS picked up Sullivan & Son to series with a 10-episode order with a premiere date set for summer 2012.

The pilot was written by Steve Byrne and Rob Long with Byrne in the starring role. Valerie Azlynn, Jodi Long, Vivian Bang, Owen Benjamin, and Dan Lauria were added to the cast in October. The show was filmed in front of a live studio audience. TBS announced that it had renewed Sullivan & Son for a second season of 10 more episodes that premiered on June 13, 2013. On August 20, 2013,  TBS announced it had renewed the series for a 13-episode third season that premiered in June 2014.

Reception

Critical reception
Sullivan & Son has received mixed to negative reviews, garnering a score of 47 out of 100 on Metacritic.

Ratings

References

External links

Sullivan and Son: Behind The Bar is the official podcast of the show. Hosted by show writer Caleb Bacon.

2010s American sitcoms
2012 American television series debuts
2014 American television series endings
Asian-American television
Fictional duos
English-language television shows
TBS (American TV channel) original programming
Television series by Warner Horizon Television
Television shows set in Pittsburgh